Charles A. Nelson III is an American neuroscientist and psychologist. His international projects include a long-standing project (with Drs.  Nathan A. Fox and Charles Zeanah) on institutionalized children in Romania, children growing up in a slum in Dhaka, Bangladesh, infants in Puerto Rico exposed to the Zika virus, and children growing up in challenging circumstances in Sao Paulo, Brazil. Dr. Nelson has also focused his research efforts on the development of memory and the ability to recognize facial expressions of emotion in infants and young children. Recently, Nelson was recognized for his on-going research with infants and children at high risk for developing autism spectrum disorder.

Nelson is a Professor of Pediatrics and Neuroscience and a Professor of Psychology in Psychiatry at Harvard Medical School, Professor of Education at Harvard University, and a Professor in the Department of Society, Human Development and Health at the Harvard School of Public Health. Nelson is the Director of Research in the Division of Developmental Medicine, Director of the Laboratories of Cognitive Neuroscience and  the Richard David Scott Chair in Pediatric Developmental Medicine Research at Boston Children's Hospital. His research interests center on a variety of problems in developmental cognitive neuroscience including: the development of social perception; developmental trajectories to autism; and the effects of early adversity on brain and behavioral development. He chaired the John D. and Catherine T. MacArthur Foundation Research Network on Early Experience and Brain Development (funded by the John D. and Catherine T. MacArthur Foundation) and served on the National Academy of Sciences (NAS) panels that wrote From Neurons to Neighborhoods, and New Directions in Child Abuse and Neglect Research. Among his many honors he has received the Leon Eisenberg award from Harvard Medical School, an honorary Doctorate from Bucharest University (Romania), was a resident fellow at the Rockefeller Foundation Bellagio (Italy) Center, has been elected to the American Academy of Arts and Sciences, the National Academy of Medicine, the British Academy  and along with Professors Fox and Zeanah has received the Ruane Prize for Child and Adolescent Psychiatric Research from the Brain & Behavior Research Foundation. In 2021 he received the Klaus J. Jacobs Research Prize.

Early career 
Nelson completed his undergraduate degree at McGill University in Montreal. He has a master's degree in psychology from the University of Wisconsin–Madison, and a Ph.D. from the University of Kansas.

Nelson completed postdoctoral training in electrophysiology at the University of Minnesota, then took his first faculty position at Purdue University in 1984, and then moved back to the University of Minnesota in 1986 to join the faculty in the Institute of Child Development.  Nelson's research laboratory at the University of Minnesota used electroencephalography to study the development of young children, particularly face processing and memory development. Dr. Nelson moved to Harvard Medical School and Boston Children’s Hospital in 2005.

Nelson Lab Studies

Bucharest Early Intervention Project (BEIP) 
Nelson is a lead researcher in the Bucharest Early Intervention Project, along with colleagues Nathan Fox and Charles Zeanah. The three researchers began the project in Bucharest, Romania in 2000. In the study, infants, abandoned since birth and raised in institutions in Bucharest, were randomly assigned either to be removed from the institution and placed into foster care or to remain in the institutions. The study is designed to examine the effects of institutionalization on the brain and behavioral development of young children and to determine if these effects can be remediated through intervention, in this case foster care. To date, BEIP has demonstrated that children raised in institutions suffer from a range of significant developmental challenges, and that children removed from institutional care and placed in high quality foster care have far better developmental outcomes than children who remain in institutions but the degree of recovery from institutional care is largely mediated by how long children remain in an institution.

Bangladesh Early Adversity  Project (BEAN) 
The Bangladesh Early Adversity Project aims to assess the effects of early adversities (e.g, biological, environmental, psychosocial) on child cognitive development. To do this, Nelson established a neuroimaging lab in Dhaka, Bangladesh where the project studies numerous cohorts below 5 years of age using methods such as EEG, fNIRS, MRI as well as behavioral measures.

Emotion Project 
The Emotion Project is a large, longitudinal study that explores how the nature and neural architecture of emotion processing develops from infancy to early childhood. 807 typically-developing infants participated in the study at either 5, 7, or 12 months of age. The data collected over the course of this study helped Nelson and his team assess how young children's differing perceptions of emotions could predict future childhood behaviors.

Infant Screening Project (ISP) 
Despite tremendous advances being made in human understanding of autism spectrum disorder (ASD), the average age of diagnosis of an ASD in the United States is >3  years of age, although in some cases a reliable diagnosis can be made as young as 18 months. The goal of the Infant Screening Project is to find signs that suggest risk for this disorder between infants with an older sibling with an autism spectrum disorder, typically developing infants, and those displaying developmental concern based on early differences detected on a screening tool.

Bibliography

Peer-reviewed journal articles

Books

Essays and reporting

References

External links 
 Charles A. Nelson III faculty spotlight at Harvard.edu
 Nelson Lab homepage
 Harvard Medical School Neuroscience program
 Center on the Developing Child at Harvard University

Living people
American neuroscientists
Harvard Medical School faculty
Year of birth missing (living people)
McGill University alumni
University of Wisconsin–Madison College of Letters and Science alumni
University of Kansas alumni
Members of the National Academy of Medicine